Crazy House may refer to:
 Crazy House (1928 film), an Our Gang short
 Crazy House (1930 film), a short comedy starring Benny Rubin and Polly Moran
 Crazy House (1940 film), a 1940 Andy Panda cartoon
 Crazy House (1943 film), a 1943 comedy film
 The Hang Nga guesthouse in Da Lat, Vietnam, commonly known as "the Crazy House"
 A slang term for a psychiatric hospital

See also
 Crazyhouse, a chess variant